Peter John Mara (born July 5, 1947) is a Canadian former professional ice hockey forward.

Early life 
Mara was born in Point Edward, Ontario. He played junior hockey with the Sarnia Legionnaires.

Career 
Mara played 107 games in the World Hockey Association with the Chicago Cougars, Denver Spurs, and Ottawa Civics. During the 1973–1974 season, while playing for the Des Moines Capitols, Peter Mara was awarded the Leo P. Lamoureux Memorial Trophy as the league's leading scorer and the James Gatschene Memorial Trophy for outstanding playing ability and sportsmanlike conduct.

External links
 

1947 births
Canadian ice hockey forwards
Chicago Cougars players
Denver Spurs (WHA) players
Ice hockey people from Ontario
Living people
Long Island Cougars players
Ottawa Civics players
People from Lambton County